The Gretsch G6131, popularly known as the Gretsch Jet Firebird, is an electric guitar made by Gretsch. The most popular use of this guitar is by late AC/DC rhythm guitarist Malcolm Young and Crowded House lead singer and Split Enz co-frontman Neil Finn.

History
The G6131 was released shortly after the Duo Jet and Silver Jet were issued. The early Jet Firebirds had two DeArmond single coil pickups and block fret-markers. In the end of the 1950s decade, the guitars had Neo-Classic Thumbnail fret-markers and two Gretsch Filtertron humbucking pickups. In 1962, however, they became double cutaway guitars with gold hardware rather than chrome. Also, instead of the standard vibratos of the earlier age, there were Burns tremolos. Then, in 1968 the Bigsbys were optional with the guitars, and instead of the Filtertrons, there were Super-trons added on it. This lasted until 1971, when Gretsch decided to switch back to the original single cut models.

Variations
There are many different versions of this guitar, such as:

 G6131T — Single cut model with dual Filtertrons; standard model
 G6131TDS — Single cut with DynaSonic pickups
 G6131TVP — Power Jet with dual TV Jones Powertron pickups; with Gretsch tailpiece
 G6131T-TVP — Power Jet with dual  TV Jones Powertron pickups; with Bigsby, Only Current Firebird in production as of 2015.
 G6131MY — Signature Model for Malcolm Young with  optional single or dual Filtertrons; double cutaway; released in 2008 and reissued in 2017; based on Young’s modified 1963 Jet Firebird
 G6131-1962 — Double Cutaway with two Filtertrons; Discontinued in 1971; Burns vibrato

References

External links
 http://www.gretschguitars.com/

G6131